Fabrizio Campani (also Fabrizio Capanus) (died 15 June 1605) was a Roman Catholic prelate who served as Bishop of Ferentino (1603–1605).

Biography
On 7 April 1603, Fabrizio Campani was appointed during the papacy of Pope Clement VIII as Bishop of Ferentino. On 20 April 1603, he was consecrated bishop by Camillo Borghese, Cardinal-Priest of San Crisogono, with Leonard Abel, Titular Bishop of Sidon, and Hippolytus Manari, Bishop of Montepeloso, serving as co-consecrators. He served as Bishop of Ferentino until his death on 15 June 1605.

See also 
Catholic Church in Italy

References

External links and additional sources
 (for Chronology of Bishops) 
 (for Chronology of Bishops) 

17th-century Italian Roman Catholic bishops
Bishops appointed by Pope Clement VIII
1605 deaths